Yelena Ivanova (born 14 March 1963) is a Soviet freestyle swimmer. She competed in the women's 800 metre freestyle at the 1980 Summer Olympics.

References

External links
 

1963 births
Living people
Olympic swimmers of the Soviet Union
Swimmers at the 1980 Summer Olympics
Place of birth missing (living people)
Soviet female freestyle swimmers